Mills County Courthouse may refer to:

Mills County Courthouse (Iowa)
Mills County Courthouse (Texas)